Leslie O. Miller (born 24 March 1948) is a Bahamian athlete, businessman and politician.

Early life

Miller was born in Nassau, the third son of contractor Leroy Miller and his wife Sybil (née Lockhart).

Athletics

Miller left Nassau for Miami in 1965 to attend first Attucks High School and then Palmetto Senior High School, where he starred in track and field.

He won gold at the 1966 Empire Games in the 440 yard dash, aged 18. In 1967, he represented his country at the Pan American Games in Canada. At the 1968 Summer Olympics in Mexico City, he competed in the men's 400 metres.

Businessman and politician 

Miller studied marketing at the University of Texas at El Paso.

A successful businessman, he served as chairman of New Providence Port Authority, chairman of the Bahamas Electricity Corporation, chairman of Town Planning, and chairman of the Water and Sewerage Corporation.

He won a seat as Member of Parliament for the Blue Hills constituency and served variously as Minister of Trade and Industry and Minister of Agriculture and Marine Resources.

References

External links
 

1948 births
Living people
Athletes (track and field) at the 1968 Summer Olympics
Bahamian male sprinters
Olympic athletes of the Bahamas
Athletes (track and field) at the 1966 British Empire and Commonwealth Games
Athletes (track and field) at the 1970 British Commonwealth Games
Athletes (track and field) at the 1967 Pan American Games
Commonwealth Games competitors for the Bahamas
Sportspeople from Nassau, Bahamas
Pan American Games competitors for the Bahamas